Invasion of the Bee Girls (UK video title: Graveyard Tramps) is a 1973 American science fiction film. The first film venture for writer Nicholas Meyer, it was directed by Denis Sanders and stars William Smith, Anitra Ford and Victoria Vetri.

The premise of the movie is that a mad scientist (Ford) is using radiation-mutated bee serum to create an army of female beauties who seduce men to death.
One by one, the male victims are killed before the local police catch on to the plans of the infected females. The script was altered while Meyer was visiting his parents. When he saw the new script, he wanted to take his name off of the project, but was convinced by his manager that he needed a credit.

Plot
Neil Agar, a special agent with the State Department's Office of Security (the predecessor of the Diplomatic Security Service), is dispatched to Peckham, California to investigate the death of John Grubowsky, a bacteriologist working at the government-sponsored Brandt Research. Quickly making the acquaintance of the laboratory's head librarian, Julie Zorn, he begins interviewing the firm's leading scientists, many of whom have reputations as sexual players. His investigation is soon complicated by a growing number of deaths, all men who died of congestive heart failure caused by sexual exhaustion.

Faced with a rapidly escalating body count, the local sheriff, Captain Peters, holds a town meeting at which the laboratory's leading sex researcher, Henry Murger, urges the town populace to practice sexual abstinence – an idea greeted with derision by the locals. Neil and Julie arrange a meeting with Murger afterwards to discuss his theories as to the cause of his deaths, only to see him chased down and run over by a car with an unseen driver. While Agar is telephoning the agency, Julie is attacked and sexually assaulted by a group of local thugs, who are then beaten up by Agar on his return. During his investigation of Murger's home in search of clues, Neil discovers a secret room concealing sexual paraphernalia and Murger's gay lover, Joe, who informs Neil that he saw Murger driving off with an unknown woman prior to his death.

Despite a curfew and the establishment of a military quarantine, the scientists continue playing their sex games. One of them, Herb Kline, is approached by Susan Harris, a beautiful entomologist working on bees. Though described by the men as an "iceberg", she flirts with Kline and invites him over for dinner. That night, as they engage in sex, Kline suffers a fatal thrombosis and Harris reveals black compound eyes, suggesting that she is more than she seems to be.

Meanwhile, convinced there is a similar pattern at work, Neil begins studying the sexual patterns of insects. Seeking information about the mating habits of honey bees, he interrogates Dr. Harris at her lab; when he departs, she resumes her project – the transformation of Kline's wife Nora into a Bee Girl through a process of controlled mutation. With the aid of other previously mutated women, she cocoons Nora and places her in a chamber where she is swarmed by mutated honey bees; when she emerges, she is bombarded with radiation and awakens with the same black compound eyes and drive to mate that the other transformed women possess. The next morning, Herb Kline's body is discovered; when Captain Peters goes to inform Nora, she attempts unsuccessfully to seduce him.

Having worked out much of what has taken place, Neil summons the remaining department chairs and presents his theory. Though the geneticist, Stan Williams, scorns the idea, the head of the diagnostics department, Aldo Ferrara, is more receptive. At Grubowsky's funeral, Neil and Julie bring a radiation detector, which picks up the gamma radiation coming from the women in attendance who have been subjected to the treatment. Aware that they have been detected, the transformed women move to eliminate the remaining scientists; Williams is nearly killed by his now-mutated wife and Ferrara dies during a visit by Dr. Harris, who then lures Julie to her lab to be transformed.

When Neil discovers Ferrara's body, he realizes what the women are up to. Racing to the lab, he interrupts the women as they begin the process of turning Julie into one of them. With Harris threatening to kill Julie unless he leaves, he moves to depart, but pulls out a revolver instead and shoots the machinery. Neil then rescues Julie and bars the door, leaving the mutated women to die amidst a cascade of exploding machinery.

Cast
 William Smith as Neil Agar
 Anitra Ford as Dr. Susan Harris
 Victoria Vetri as Julie Zorn
 Cliff Osmond as Captain Peters
 Wright King as Dr. Henry Murger
 Ben Hammer as Herb Kline
 Anna Aries as Nora Kline
 Andre Philippe as Aldo Ferrara
 Sid Kaiser as Stan Williams
 Katie Saylor as Gretchen Grubowsky
 Beverly Powers as Harriet Williams
 Cliff Emmich as Coroner
 Jack Perkins as Barney

Sequel
A semi-sequel to the movie, the play Beyond the Invasion of the Bee Girls was produced by House of Dames in 1998 in Seattle, Washington.

Home media releases
The movie was released on DVD as Graveyard Tramps and featured on the compilation Stephen Romano Presents Shock Festival.  Invasion of the Bee Girls was also released on DVD as part of a four-movie package called Four Cult Movie Marathon Volume 1.

Scream Factory released the movie on Blu-ray on April 4, 2017.

See also

 List of American films of 1973

References

External links

1973 films
1970s exploitation films
1970s science fiction horror films
American science fiction horror films
American sexploitation films
1970s English-language films
Films directed by Denis Sanders
Films scored by Charles Bernstein
Mad scientist films
Films with screenplays by Nicholas Meyer
Dimension Pictures films
American body horror films
1970s American films